The slalom competition is shorter than the giant slalom, but is otherwise similar in emphasizing maneuverability. Slalom has been a part of all the Winter Olympics since 1936, although it was a part of the alpine combination that year. Only the downhill event has a longer history at the Winter Olympics. The men's slalom took place on 25 February and was the last of the Olympic alpine skiing competitions.

Jean-Pierre Vidal of France was the defending Olympic champion, but he hadn't won a World Cup slalom event since the 2001–02 season. Nevertheless, Vidal was fourth in the slalom World Cup, one place ahead of defending World Champion Benjamin Raich. The Italian Giorgio Rocca led the World Cup after winning all five races thus far in the season, 215 points ahead of the second-placed American Ted Ligety.

Results
Complete results from the men's slalom event at the 2006 Winter Olympics.

References

External links
Official Olympic Report

Slalom